Love Renaissance (LVRN) is an American record label and management company founded by Carlon Ramong, Justice Baiden, Junia Abaidoo, Sean Famoso McNichol and Tunde Balogun, and based in Atlanta, Georgia. The label is currently distributed through Interscope Records, a unit of Universal Music Group. The label currently houses artists 6lack, Summer Walker, BRS Kash, Alex Vaughn, Eli Derby, and North Ave Jax. LVRN manages artists Shelley FKA DRAM, Westside Boogie, Dvsn, Davido, and Spinall.

History
Love Renaissance (LVRN) was founded in 2012 by rival party promoters Carlon Ramong, Justice Baiden, Junia Abaidoo, Sean Famoso McNichol, and Tunde Balogun while students at Georgia State University. The agency specializes in talent management, creative direction, and production, as well as marketing and strategic partnerships. The first artist under the label was a singer-songwriter, Raury. In 2016, they added two more artists, DRAM and 6lack, to their roster.

On July 14, 2017, the label signed a distribution deal with Interscope Records, and launched a creative space studio in Atlanta called LVRN Studios. Sean Famoso said "This launch is another example of the power and influence of Atlanta's youth in the industry and culture. This studio and creative space belongs to the rest of the city as much as it does us. We want to make sure this place serves as a reminder nobody should have to travel across the country to Los Angeles or New York to get started on their dream." Tunde Balogun spoke with Billboard saying "What we're doing isn't a flash in the pan - it's about developing artists for the long run, that's Interscope's goal as well. That's why this works." On January 8, 2018, Raury left the label to become an independent artist.

In 2019 and 2020, the label signed artists Cruel Santino, Kitty Ca$h, OMB Bloodbath, Eli Derby, Young Rog, and BRS Kash. The latter's signing was pushed by his hit single, "Throat Baby (Go Baby)". On November 16, 2020, the label released their first compilation album titled Home for the Holidays, featuring the LVRN roster. In February 2021, the label entered into a publishing partnership with Warner Chappell, including the new signing of GMK, and Genio Bambino. On April 27, 2021, LVRN announced the management signing of R&B duo Dvsn. On May 5, LVRN released a hip hop cypher with Spotify, introducing Cleveland rapper NoonieVsEverybody to the label.

Roster

Current artists

Management

Former artists

Discography

Studio albums

Compilation albums

Extended plays

Mixtapes

References

American record labels
Contemporary R&B record labels
Hip hop record labels
Record labels established in 2012